Jarl Frithiof Lundqvist (August 15, 1896 in Helsinki – September 23, 1965) was a Finnish lieutenant general. Lundqvist was the Commander of the Finnish Air Force from 8 September 1932 to 29 June 1945.  After World War II, he was the Chief of Defence of the Finnish Defence Forces between 1945 and 1946.

External links
 Finnish Air Force: Jarl Lundqvist 
The Finnish Defence Forces: Chiefs of Defence 

|-

|-

|-

1896 births
1965 deaths
Military personnel from Helsinki
People from Uusimaa Province (Grand Duchy of Finland)
Swedish-speaking Finns
Finnish lieutenant generals
German military personnel of World War I
People of the Finnish Civil War (White side)
Finnish military personnel of World War II